Chrysler is the name of a major American automobile manufacturer officially known as Stellantis North America.

Chrysler or Crysler may also refer to:

Automotive
 Chrysler Australia, former auto manufacturer and importer 
 Chrysler Canada, Chrysler's Canadian subsidiary since 1925
 Chrysler Europe (1967–1979), European division of the former Chrysler Group 
 DaimlerChrysler, the former parent company of Daimler-Benz, Created by the 1998 merger of Daimler-Benz and Chrysler
 Fiat Chrysler Automobiles, the former parent company of FCA Italy (Fiat) and FCA USA (Chrysler), now Stellantis

Places
 Chrysler Building, a skyscraper in New York City, US
 Crysler, a community in North Stormont, Ontario, Canada
 Chrysler Museum of Art, an art museum in Norfolk, Virginia, US

People
 Dick Chrysler (born 1942), former member of the United States House of Representatives
 Morgan Henry Chrysler (1822–1890), American Civil War general
 Walter P. Chrysler (1875–1940), founder of the Chrysler Corporation
 Walter P. Chrysler Jr. (1909-1988), American art collector

Other uses
 Battle of Crysler's Farm, fought on 11 November 1813, during the Anglo-American War of 1812

See also
 Kreisler, a surname